Lindon is an unincorporated community and a U.S. Post Office located in Washington County, Colorado, United States.  The Lindon Post Office has the ZIP Code 80740.

Geography
Lindon is located at  (39.736894,-103.405552).
Lindon's previous names included Linden and Harrisburg.

Climate

According to the Köppen Climate Classification system, Lindon has a cold semi-arid climate, abbreviated "BSk" on climate maps.

References

Unincorporated communities in Washington County, Colorado
Unincorporated communities in Colorado